Mordellistena coleae is a beetle in the genus Mordellistena of the family Mordellidae. It was described in 1917 by George Charles Champion.

References

coleae
Beetles described in 1917